Husbands and Wives is a 1992 film by Woody Allen.

Husbands and Wives may also refer to:

"Husbands and Wives" (song), by Roger Miller, 1966; covered by Brooks & Dunn, 1998
Husbands and Wives: Love or War, or The Clinic for Married Couples: Love and War, a South Korean TV series
"Husbands and Wives" (Roseanne), a 1995 television episode
Husbands and Wives (1920 film), based on a novel by Corra May Harris
Husbands and Wives, a 1977 TV film starring Eddie Barth

See also 
 Husband and Wife (disambiguation)
 Missionaries and cannibals problem, or jealous husbands problem, a toy problem in artificial intelligence